Belenois theora, the forest caper white, is a butterfly in the family Pieridae. It is found in Guinea, Liberia, Ivory Coast, Ghana, Togo, Benin, Nigeria, Cameroon, the Central African Republic, the Democratic Republic of the Congo, Uganda, Sudan and Tanzania. The habitat consists of woodland and forest margins.

The larvae feed on Capparis species.

Subspecies
B. t. theora Sierra Leone to Nigeria
B. t. ratheo  (Suffert, 1904) Central African Republic
B. t. laeta  (Weymer, 1903)

References

External links
Seitz, A. Die Gross-Schmetterlinge der Erde 13: Die Afrikanischen Tagfalter. Plate XIII 13 
Seitz, A. Die Gross-Schmetterlinge der Erde 13: Die Afrikanischen Tagfalter. Plate XIII 12
Seitz, A. Die Gross-Schmetterlinge der Erde 13: Die Afrikanischen Tagfalter. Plate XIII 15 as ratheo

Butterflies described in 1846
Pierini